Berlin School may refer to:

Berlin School of Creative Leadership
Berlin School of filmmaking
Berlin School of electronic music, or Krautrock
Berlin School of experimental psychology
Berliner Modell (Berlin School of Didactic method developed by Paul Heimann (1901–1967))
Berlin Pleiades (Berlin School of Chess)